Ashgrove is an inner north-western suburb in the City of Brisbane, Queensland, Australia. It has many heritage-listed buildings:

 44 Ashbourne  Street: Oakleigh State School
 24-30 Ashgrove Avenue: Ashgrove Methodist Church (former)
 116 Ashgrove Avenue: Grove Lodge
 120 Ashgrove Avenue: Anzac  Cottage
 140 Ashgrove Avenue: 140 Ashgrove  Avenue, Ashgrove
 60 Ashgrove Crescent:  Shop
 2 Atthow Avenue: 2 Atthow Avenue,  Ashgrove
 34 Devonshire Street: 34 Devonshire  Street, Ashgrove
 40 Dorset Street: 40 Dorset Street,  Ashgrove
 67 Elimatta Drive: Grantuly (sometimes written as Grantully)
 182 Frasers Road: Tower Block &  Memorial Gates Marist College
 Glenlyon Drive: Avenue of  Trees
 34 Glenlyon Drive: Glen Lyon
 31 Glory Street: Ashgrove State School
 Kenwyn Road: Porphyry  retaining wall, Ithaca Creek
 9 Killawarra Road: 9 Killawarra Road,  Ashgrove
 16 Lindsay Street: 16 Lindsay Street,  Ashgrove
 1 Mareeba Road: Air Raid  Shelter
 47 Mclean Parade: 47 Mclean Parade,  Ashgrove
 16 Oleander Drive: former St David's Presbyterian/Uniting Church
 31 Piddington Street: St John's Wood House
 33 Piddington Street: former St John's  Wood servants' quarters
 8 Stewart Road: Tram  Shelter
 8 Stewart Road: Stewart Place  (including war memorial)
 142 St Johns Avenue: Ashgrove Golf  Course (part)
 Waterworks Road (near Mossvale Street): Ithaca  Bridge 
 Waterworks Road: Tram  Shelter
 101 Waterworks Road: former Tram Shelter
 152 Waterworks Road: 152 Waterworks  Road, Ashgrove
 180 Waterworks Road: 180 Waterworks  Road, Ashgrove
 202 Waterworks Road: St Finbarr's Catholic Church
 290 Waterworks Road: St Paul's Anglican  Church
 309 Waterworks Road: former Ashgrove Private Hospital
 498 Waterworks Road: Montvue  Buildings
 24 Woodland Street: Woodlands

References 

Ashgrove
Heritage of Ashgrove
Heritage